Ingris Rivera (born 1988), is a Colombian chess player who holds the FIDE title of Woman International Master (WIM, 2006). She is a two-time Colombian Women's Chess Championship winner (2005, 2015).

Biography
In 2001, Ingris Rivera won Pan American Youth Girl's Chess Championship in U14 age group. In 2007, she won Pan American Junior Girl's Chess Championship in U20 age group.
Rivera two times won Colombian Women's Chess Championship: in 2005 and 2015. In 2006, she participated in Women's World Chess Championship by knock-out system and in the first round lost to Maia Chiburdanidze.

Rivera played for Colombia in the Women's Chess Olympiads:
 In 2002, at third board in the 35th Chess Olympiad (women) in Bled (+5, =4, -5),
 In 2014, at third board in the 41st Chess Olympiad (women) in Tromsø (+4, =2, -3),
 In 2016, at fourth board in the 42nd Chess Olympiad (women) in Baku (+6, =2, -2),
 In 2018, at third board in the 43rd Chess Olympiad (women) in Batumi (+2, =0, -5).

In 2006, she was awarded the FIDE Woman International Master (WIM) title.

Rivera was ranked best female chess player in Colombia in May 2020.

References

External links

1988 births
Living people
Colombian chess players
Chess Olympiad competitors
Chess Woman International Masters
21st-century Colombian women